Cabra Dominican College is a private, independent Catholic high school located at Cumberland Park, an inner-southern suburb in Adelaide, South Australia. It was established by an order of Dominican sisters from Cabra, Dublin in February 1886 with nine sisters, and caring for 37 boarders and 4-day girls. Originally offering a co-educational primary education and a high school education for girls, it began accepting boys into the high school in 1978.

The school caters for about 1,200 students and serves educational year grades from middle school to senior school (grade 7 to 13). The college also offers a grade 13 for those who wish to further their education or if further education is necessary. The college also accepts many international students from countries including Japan and Italy.

The college is distinguished by its rust coloured blazers – with the school colour scheme being gold, red, black and white.

History
The school is steeped in history and has been around for 130 years. In the year of 1206, Dominic Guzman founded in Prouille, in southern France, a Religious Order of women to care for and instruct young women of that area. This foundation led to the establishment of many Dominican establishments including schools, universities and colleges. In 1868, seven Dominican sisters were invited by the Bishop of Adelaide to visit the South Australian city. The sisters opened a day and boarding school in Franklin Street in inner-Adelaide. The school was moved to the current location in the suburb of Cumberland Park in 1886. At the time, the southern suburbs where Cumberland Park is located, was regarded as a rural farmland area, because at the time the area was largely uninhabited and unoccupied. The school was named after the location of Cabra, the mother house of the Dominican sisters, where they originated from in Ireland, a leading educational establishment.

The foundation for the original Cabra building (The Convent) was first laid in March 1885. By the end of the year, the northern and western wings of the main building were established. The school officially opened in February 1886, with a total of nine sisters caring for 37 boarders and 3-day girls. There were an additional 71 girls in the intermediate school and most of these lived in South Australia. The school grew to over 93 boarders and 232-day pupils in the early 1950s. In 1978, the college itself began accepting boys. In 1999, the boarding school closed after over 110 years.

List of Principals 
*this section is under construction*

House system 
In 2017, the four houses of students which were previously only used for sports day, were replaced by four new houses that act somewhat independently from each other. Unlike the pre-2017 houses, the current ones cause the areas of the school to be divided via house, rather than year level. For example, the northernmost building on the school campus (named "Aquinas" after Saint Thomas Aquinas) was previously allocated to the senior year levels for home classrooms & lockers but is now the location of Moore House.

Each house is led by two key staff members known as 'house leaders' who each look after a group of students in their house for the duration of the students time at the college. Each house also has a student leadership team led by two peer elected senior house captains in year 12 who are then aided by year level house captains in each year level from year 7-11.

The four houses are all named after Nuns which initially came from Ireland to Australia to found the school. The four houses are as follows:

Boylan  
Named after Mother Mary Columba Boylan, OP. who was sent down to South Australia in 1875 to assist with the troubles the sisters were facing after the death of Teresa Moore. She took charge of the boarding school and planned to make a complete college which was finished in 1886. The house colours for Boylan are dark blue and light blue; double blues.

Kavanagh  
Named after Mother Mary Catherine Kavanagh, OP. who took charge of Cabra after the death of Columba Boylan. She considered herself Dominican at Heart, as did most of the other sisters. This was another contribution as to why she was considered a good leader. The house colours for Kavanagh are green and gold.

Moore  
Named after Mother Mary Teresa Moore, OP. who led the initial group of founding sisters of the college in 1868. As the first Prioress of St. Mary's Franklin Street, she conditioned the building of a small girls boarding school. The house colours for Moore are red and white.

Murphy  
Named after Mother Mary Catherine Murphy, OP. who was the assistant of Teresa Moore. She was a vital contribution to the sisters overcoming hardships faced after the excommunication of Saint Mary of the Cross MacKillop in 1871. The house colours for Murphy are purple and orange.

Sports Day 
Since 2006, the school has held an annual Sports Day. It was revamped in 2017 with the creation of the modern house system. Each student can choose to participate in a selection of sports, with each winning game and/or participation adding to each house's points score. Some games that require large space or long participation are played before the main day.

Students are encouraged to not wear the school uniform, but instead wear clothing using their house's colour. This is one of the only times students are permitted to go to school without a uniform.

2 awards are given on the day. The first, and the most prized, is the "Main Cup", which the house with the most points is awarded. The second is the "Spirit Cup", which is given to the house that had the most sportsmanship and best chants.

Veritas Magazine 
Since the establishment of the College, the Veritas Magazine has been printed annually and distributed to staff, families, and old scholars at the end of every year. Veritas captures a snapshot of the College for that year incorporating contributions from staff and students.

St. Mary's Unit 
The St Mary's Unit was established at Cabra Dominican College in 1981. In its thirty-plus years, the St Mary's Unit has brought many meaningful teaching and learning experiences for the students. The St Mary's Unit students enrich the Cabra Dominican College community with their enthusiasm, passion and talents.

The unit provides specialised life education curriculum programs for students with diagnosed intellectual disabilities. Below is an outline of the curriculum focus. Please note that the enrolment process and selection criteria are the same for the St Mary's Unit, as that of the College.

Events 
The College holds and runs many events, most of which are held annually.

Either on or near major Catholic celebrations, the school may host a mass. They are usually performed in Caleruega Hall to accommodate the vast majority of students and staff. During the construction of the new Caleruega Hall in 2019, mass and other large gatherings were held either in St. Brigid's Square or on the North-Eastern portion of the Large Oval. In the South Australian outbreak of the 2020 COVID-19 pandemic, the majority of masses scheduled were cancelled.

Big Screen on the Green is an annual event held by staff. Students would purchase tickets from the school for $5, and the community would gather on an oval to watch a large projection of a movie. It has been cancelled annually since 2017 - In 2018 due to low ticket sales, 2019 due to bad weather, and 2020 due to the COVID-19 pandemic.

A yearly celebration of St. Dominic's feast day including a whole school mass and a school talent quest. During construction of Caleruega Hall, the event was held at the Netball SA Stadium (a.k.a. Priceline Stadium) for the 2019 event.

 Intercollege Sports (Intercol)
 House Celebrates Nights

Buildings 

The largest building on the college grounds is the original convent that was built in 1885. A large proportion of the ground level houses the college admin staff, including the college principal. The home economics kitchen and classroom are also located within the ground level as is the college boardroom.

Opened in 2017, the newly developed St. Catherine's Wing saw the old music rooms become 4 multipurpose classrooms split across the upper two levels of the convent. The St. Catherine's Wing is home to Kavanagh house.

The eastern side of convent houses the St. Bridget's wing which includes a multitude of various music rooms and facilities. It is the namesake of St. Brigid's Square on the west of the wing, a common gathering area which is used for student-held handball matches during the morning and breaks. It is notoriously difficult to play on due to its size.
The Aquinas building is a two-story building located at the front of the college. The ground floor of the building has various science laboratories including specialised facilities for chemistry, physics, and biology. On the second level of the Aquinas building, some 15 multipurpose classrooms are located. Aquinas is home to Moore House.

Originally a science laboratory, Aquinas Theatre is now one of three dedicated dance and drama spaces that the college offers. At times it is often used to hold year level or house assemblies.

The Notre Dame cluster of buildings comprises the staff room, various staff offices, and the General Science Lab which is mainly used for students in Grade 7.

Redeveloped in 2017 to accommodate a new library at the college, O'Mara is made up of 10 classrooms, one of which is a general science lab. O'Mara is home to Boylan House.

The permanent location of the Monica Farrelly Library, the Atrium contains the IT desk and a Library housing over 10,000 books, audiobooks and DVDs.

An offshoot of O'Mara, this wing includes the St. Mary's Unit and the Learning Centre. At the western edge of the building is Student Services and the Maitron.

The St. Dominics Classrooms hold claim to multiple general use classrooms and a "Media Centre".

Opened in 2003, the Fra Angelico Arts Centre's 5 classrooms are used for art, woodworking and metalwork. It acts as a general creative area, often used for construction of decorations around the college. The maintenance shed is technically a part of the building, although being only a small shed, garage, kitchen, and single classroom. It was announced in mid-2021 that the building would be renovated extensively, including the addition of a second floor. 

Caleruega Hall is the newest of Cabra's campus. Up until 2018, a small, corrugated-iron gym was located at the site, but was demolished as part of a series of renovations in the school. Its first use was for Cabra Celebrates 2019, but officially began use in the first term of the 2020 school year. The Hall is predominately used as a gym, but also includes a "Sports Office" and "Sports Shed". New improvements to the building include air conditioning and retractable, permanent bleachers.

St. Dominic's Hall acts as a multipurpose auditorium, used primarily for drama lessons. SDH has welcomed performers to the school since 2017, some of which also perform at the Adelaide Fringe.

Logo 

The Coat of Arms of Cabra Dominican College (incorrectly referred to as the College Crest) has changed once or twice since the school's foundation in 1886. The design of the Escutcheon (shield) in the logo is based on the arms of the Dominican Order. The shield is divided evenly into eight gyrons, alternating sable and argent. These colours, more commonly called black and white, are the armourial colours of the Guzmán family, Guzmán being the family name of Saint Dominic, the founder of the Dominican Order. The black and white Cross in the centre of the shield was worn by the knights of the Order of Calatrava, a family of which St Dominic's mother was of.  At each end of the cross is a stylised fleur-de-lis, called a 'Flowering of the Cross', which represents purity. The symbol above the shield (the crest) is a Five-pointed star, which is placed in memory of the star seen on St Dominic's forehead during his baptism. The motto below the shield is Latin text reading Veritas, which literally translates to 'Truth'. This is in reference to the role of a Dominican, which is to preach the Truth of God.

Popular culture 
Many of the indoor scenes for Boys in The Trees (2016) were filmed at the College.

Notable alumni

 Jason Gillespie - Australian cricketer
Brodie Grundy - AFL footballer
 Orianthi Panagaris - singer
 Margaret White - First female judge of the Supreme Court of Queensland
Robyn Layton - Judge
Samuel Davis, 17-year-old male who made headlines after his death from a coward punch at a Brighton party in May 2008.

See also
 List of schools in South Australia

References

High schools in South Australia
Private schools in South Australia
Educational institutions established in 1886
Dominican schools in Australia
1886 establishments in Australia